The Louisville Black Caps were a professional Negro league baseball team based in Louisville, Kentucky. The team played as the Black Caps in the Negro National League in 1930 before playing as the Louisville White Sox in 1931.

In 1932, they joined the Negro Southern League, again playing as the Black Caps.  Only five months into the season, the team relocated to play as the Columbus Turfs for the remaining month and a half before folding.

References

 
Defunct baseball teams in Kentucky
Negro league baseball teams
Baseball teams established in 1930
Sports clubs disestablished in 1932
1930 establishments in Kentucky
1932 disestablishments in Kentucky
Baseball teams disestablished in 1932